Kinugasa may refer to:

Kinugasa (surname), a Japanese surname
Japanese cruiser Kinugasa, an Aoba class heavy cruiser of the Imperial Japanese Navy
Kinugasa (plant), a synonym of the flowering plant genus Paris
Kinugasa Station, a train station in Yokosuka, Kanagawa, Japan
Phallus indusiatus, a species of edible mushroom known as kinugasatake ("Kinugasa mushroom") in Japanese cuisine